Giovanni Cuomo (Salerno, 23 December 1874 – 24 March 1948) was an Italian politician, lawyer and teacher.

Life

Born in Salerno in 1874, Cuomo since teenager followed ideals of liberalism & nationalism. He graduated as lawyer in 1905

He was elected deputy for the first time November 16, 1919 in XXV Legislature of the Kingdom of Italy and was a member of the Standing Committee for Public Education. Re-elected in XXVI Legislature, he was faithful to the liberal line of Giovanni Amendola. 

After the onset of Fascism, he decided to retire from active political life to dedicate himself to his lawyer career and to teaching. But, after the fall of Mussolini and the end of the regime, he was called in 1943 first as Secretary and then as Minister of National Education in the first Badoglio government, during the constitutional transition.

In 1944 obtained the creation of the Magistero faculty in Salerno, that was the first development of the University of Salerno (that was created after WW2): it is considered as the "continuation" of the historical Schola Medica Salernitana.

Giovanni Cuomo was elected "senator" in 1946 and died in his Salerno in 1948.

His personal library is preserved as a special collection in the University of Salerno Central Library E.R. Caianiello and consists of over 11000 volumes.

Main works

 Literary writings
 
 
 
 

 Law & historical books

References

Bibliography
 Bonani, Vittoria. Giovanni Cuomo e il suo tempo: 1943-1948 Gaia Ed. Salerno, 2007

External links
 Giovanni Cuomo in SHARE Catalogue

1874 births
1948 deaths
20th-century Italian lawyers
Italian politicians
Italian educators
Place of birth missing